Dragoljub Avramović (born 10 February 1979) is a Serbian professional basketball coach in the Mega Basket youth system.

Coaching career 
Since 2010, Avramović coached youth systems of Belgrade-based clubs Beovuk 72 and Partizan prior he joined Mega Basket in July 2018. Coaching the Mega Basket U18 & U19 selections, Avramović won the Junior ABA League in 2020–21 and 2021–22, as well as the Euroleague Basketball Next Generation Tournament in 2021–22.

National team coaching career 
In August 2021, Avramović was the head coach of the Serbia national under-16 team at the 2021 FIBA U16 European Challengers, winning the Group C with a 5–0 record. In December 2021, the Basketball Federation of Serbia named Avramović as their new head coach for the Serbia U17 team in 2022. His team finished the 5th at the 2022 FIBA Under-17 Basketball World Cup.

Career achievements 
 Euroleague NGT champion: 1 (with Mega Basket: 2021–22)
 Junior ABA League champion: 2 (with Mega Basket: 2020–21, 2021–22)

References

External links
 Coach Profile at aba-liga.com

1979 births
Living people
Serbian men's basketball coaches
Sportspeople from Belgrade